Colossus (Piotr "Peter" Nikolayevich Rasputin) (Russian: Пётр Николаевич Распутин) is a character appearing in American comic books published by Marvel Comics. Created by writer Len Wein and artist Dave Cockrum, he first appeared in Giant-Size X-Men #1 (May 1975).

A Russian mutant, he is a member of the X-Men. Colossus is able to transform himself into metallic form, making him the physically strongest of the team. He is portrayed as quiet, honest, and virtuous. He has had a fairly consistent presence in X-Men-related comic books since his debut. A talented artist, he only reluctantly agrees to use his powers in combat, feeling it is his responsibility to use his abilities for the betterment of human- and mutant-kind.

Wizard ranked Colossus at 184 on the "Top 200 Comic Book Characters of All Time". In 2006, IGN placed Colossus in the 10th spot of their list of "The Top 25 X-Men". In 2013, ComicsAlliance ranked Colossus as #22 on their list of the "50 Sexiest Male Characters in Comics".

In film, Donald MacKinnon made a cameo appearance as Colossus in X-Men before X2, X-Men: The Last Stand, and X-Men: Days of Future Past while Stefan Kapičić voices a separate iteration of Colossus in Deadpool and Deadpool 2.

Concept and creation
Editor Roy Thomas, in charge of reviving the X-Men for Giant-Size X-Men #1 (May 1975), told the creative team to go home and create some characters for the new team. Dave Cockrum recalled:I just went home and Colossus was one of the first ones that came to mind. We needed a strong guy for the team, so I drew up a strong guy. The character's armor just kind of fell into place. He was accepted pretty much as-is, except that I had given him bare legs because it seemed only logical that if we're going to show him armored up, the legs should be bare like the arms. But Len Wein didn't like male characters with bare legs. So we decided that his costume would be blue when he wasn't armored up, and that we'd see his legs when he was armored up, due to the unstable molecules of his costume.

Publication history

A mainstay of the X-Men comic book series until the 1990s, Colossus went on to appear regularly in the first series of Excalibur. While a member of the team, he had his own self-titled one-shot that depicted him and his teammate Meggan battling Arcade at his new Murderworld facility.

After returning to the X-Men alongside Excalibur teammates Shadowcat and Nightcrawler, Colossus stayed with the title until his death. He was later resurrected and was a regular in the third series of Astonishing X-Men written by Joss Whedon. He is the feature of a limited series, Colossus: Bloodlines, in which he journeys back to Russia. Colossus has since returned as a regular in the X-Men series, appearing in various titles such as X-Men: Manifest Destiny, X-Men: Secret Invasion, X-Men, and Astonishing X-Men.

Colossus appears in Cable and X-Force, a new series by writer Dennis Hopeless and artist Salvador Larroca which debuted in Dec. 2012. He appears in Extraordinary X-Men, written by Jeff Lemire and drawn by Humberto Ramos. He is part of a team which is led by Storm, and includes his sister Magik, Iceman, a teenaged version of Jean Grey, Nightcrawler, a re-purposed Sentinel named Cerebra, and Old Man Logan.

Fictional character biography

Background

Piotr "Peter" Rasputin was born on a Soviet collective farm called the Ust-Ordynsky Collective near Lake Baikal in Siberia. He lived there with his mother Alexandra, father Nikolai, and sister Illyana. His older brother, Mikhail, had been a Soviet cosmonaut and had apparently died in a rocket accident. The 2006 comic mini-series Colossus: Bloodline established that the family was descended from Grigori Rasputin.

Peter's superhuman powers manifested during his adolescence while saving his sister from a runaway tractor. He was then contacted by Professor Charles Xavier, founder of the X-Men.

X-Men
Peter Rasputin was part of the second generation of X-Men, formed by Charles Xavier to save the original X-Men from the living island Krakoa. He agreed to leave the farm community where he was born to go to the United States with Xavier. Xavier gave him the name Colossus. After the battle was won, Colossus remained in the U.S. with the new X-Men.

Colossus is typically portrayed as peaceful, selfless, reluctant to hurt or kill, and often putting himself in danger to protect others. In some of his earliest missions, he battled the Shi'ar Imperial Guard, and visited the Savage Land, where he met Nereel.

Peter's family always remained in his thoughts and he frequently wrote letters home. Shortly after joining the X-Men, a woman known as Miss Locke kidnapped many of the team's loved ones to force the X-Men to help her free her employer, Arcade, from captivity by one of Doctor Doom's robots. Among her captives was Colossus' younger sister Illyana, whom Locke had kidnapped from the Siberian collective farm and transported to the United States. Arcade brainwashed Colossus into becoming "The Proletarian", who then battled the other X-Men until they countered the brainwashing. The X-Men freed Illyana from captivity, and she went to live with her brother Peter at Xavier's mansion. She was later held captive in a dimension known as Limbo, where she spent years while only mere moments elapsed on Earth, and became the adolescent sorceress Magik. As a result, an alternate-timeline version of Colossus dies in Limbo.

When the X-Men fought the evil mutant Proteus, Colossus attempted to kill Proteus, an act he found morally questionable even though he did it to save Moira MacTaggert's life. During his early career with the X-Men, Peter started what was arguably his most significant relationship with fellow X-Man Kitty Pryde. Although they were only a couple for a short while, the relationship provided the foundation of a deep and lasting friendship.

Colossus was later almost killed in a battle with Mystique's Brotherhood of Mutants, but was saved by Rogue and the Morlock Healer. During the Secret Wars, he became infatuated with the alien healer Zsaji, and realized his feelings for his teammate were not wholly genuine, ending his relationship with Kitty Pryde. Emotionally distraught, he afterwards engaged in a bar fight with Juggernaut.

During the Mutant Massacre, Colossus became heavily involved in the X-Men's efforts to save the Morlocks from the Marauders. When Kitty was severely injured by Harpoon, Peter gave in to his rage and snapped Riptide's neck. He eventually passed out from previous wounds inflicted by Riptide. Magneto, with the aid of Shadowcat, used his powers to heal Peter's armored form, but the process left him paralyzed. He was sent to Muir Island to recuperate, along with Nightcrawler, Shadowcat, and the surviving Morlocks.

Over time, Colossus' wounds healed, but he was trapped in his armored form and could maintain his human form only with the utmost concentration. When he saw the X-Men in Dallas during the Fall of the Mutants, he had his sister teleport him to the battle, as Destiny had not seen him in her vision of the X-Men's demise. When the team decided to sacrifice themselves to stop the Adversary, Colossus gave his life alongside them to save the world. Like the rest of the X-Men, he was revived by Roma and decided to let the world believe him dead while he and the X-Men worked out of an Australian base.

Following the Inferno event, Illyana was returned to her original Earth age. Colossus decided it would be better for Illyana if she went back to live with their parents in Russia.

In time, Colossus was reunited with Nereel in the Savage Land, and met her son.

After the X-Men began falling apart with Rogue vanishing, Wolverine taking off, Longshot quitting, and Storm apparently killed, Psylocke telepathically prodded the remaining three to disband and travel through the Siege Perilous to gain new lives. Peter emerged in New York with no memory of his past life, inventing a new persona for himself as 'Peter Nicholas', where he quickly became a successful artist. He battled the Genoshan Magistrates. He began having visions of a beautiful model, who turned out to be Callisto transformed by Masque. The two were kidnapped by the Morlocks, though Peter had no memory of his time with the X-Men. He resumed his armored form and defeated Masque. He was saved by Forge, Banshee, and Jean Grey, who decided it better that he live his new life rather than be dragged back into theirs.

Peter was psychically dominated by the Shadow King and sent to hunt down Stevie Hunter and Charles Xavier. Xavier had no choice but to destroy the Peter Nicholas persona to break the Shadow King's hold. Colossus joined in the battle of Muir Island, and rejoined the X-Men as a member of Storm's Gold Strike Force. Peter is shown to be traveling to the Savage Land, where he locates Nereel. He is astonished to learn that the child she bore was not his, but that of another lover. Disheartened, he departs the Savage Land.

The X-Men later found themselves in another dimension, where they discovered that Colossus' brother, Mikhail, was alive and acting as a messiah to the population of that world. Mikhail returned to Earth with the X-Men, but was distraught with having been responsible for the deaths of the original crew from his first trek into the other dimension.

Mikhail established himself as leader of the Morlocks and planned to use them as a part of his mass suicide which he thought would grant him retribution or at least reprieve from his guilt. This would prove to be a great source of grief for Peter in an upcoming string of family deaths that would lead to him temporarily disbanding from the X-Men.

However, unbeknownst to the X-Men, Mikhail survived. In a seemingly last second change of mind, Mikhail transported himself and the Morlocks to another world. Later, upon learning this, Peter was disappointed by his brother's departure and blamed himself.

Back in Siberia, Peter's parents were slain and Illyana kidnapped by the Russian government, who hoped to genetically evolve Illyana to the point where she would have the use of her powers again, to defeat the mutant known as the Soul Skinner. Colossus, with the help of the X-Men, saved Illyana and brought her back to the Mansion.

Later, Illyana became an early victim of the Legacy Virus and died from it. The loss of his immediate family, as well as brain damage that forced him to remain in armored form, caused Colossus to rethink his position with the X-Men and join Magneto and his Acolytes, who had offered him an alternative to the X-Men's pacifist philosophy of peaceful mutant/human coexistence. Colossus recovered from the brain damage soon after, but decided to remain with the Acolytes of his own volition, hoping he could temper their extremist methods with what he had learned from Professor Xavier.

Excalibur
His stay with Magneto was not long once he realized that Avalon was not the place for him, either, particularly after Magneto was left brain-dead and the space station was destroyed by Holocaust. He left in search of the only person he felt truly cared for him, his former love and teammate Shadowcat, now a member of Excalibur. Colossus traveled to England, where he found Kitty in the arms of her new love, Pete Wisdom. Colossus, exhausted, mentally ill, and enraged, attacked Wisdom and, although the battle was short, Piotr nearly killed him. Colossus was subdued by Captain Britain and Meggan, later cured of his illness by Moira MacTaggert.

Colossus accepted Shadowcat's new life and chose to become a member of Excalibur. Although Colossus, along with the rest of the team, soon accepted Kitty's relationship with Wisdom, Kitty's pet dragon, Lockheed, did not, and was often seen trying to reunite Kitty with Peter, whom he much preferred. One such example being snatching away the garter during Meggan and Captain Britain's wedding and dropping it into Colossus' hand, who was then required to place it on Kitty's leg, who had previously caught the bride's flowers. With Excalibur, he participated in many adventures, including helping to save London from an ancient demon. Excalibur eventually disbanded, and Colossus returned with Nightcrawler and Shadowcat to the X-Men. But as soon as they returned, they faced a group of imposters following Cerebro, in the guise of Professor X. During this time, he repaired his friendships with Wolverine and Storm, that were broken when he had joined the Acolytes. He formed a deep friendship with Marrow. Peter again found his long thought-dead brother Mikhail, but unfortunately lost him again when Apocalypse collected The Twelve in his quest for power.

Death
Using thoughts and notes from the recently murdered Moira MacTaggert, the X-Men's resident scientist, Beast, claimed to have found the cure for the Legacy Virus. Unfortunately, it could only be made airborne with the death of its first user. Rather than wait for a safer version and allow others to die as Illyana had, Colossus injected himself with the cure. By using his powers and sacrificing himself, Colossus enabled the release of an airborne cure, effectively eradicating the disease. His body was cremated, and Shadowcat took his ashes back to Russia to be scattered on his native soil.

Return
Nearly two years later, it was brought to the attention of the X-Men that a medical company, entitled Benetech, had developed a mutant cure. After gaining a sample of the cure, Dr. Henry (Beast) McCoy discovered a string of DNA hidden deep within the recesses of the formula. After matching the DNA, Beast and the other X-Men set out to investigate the truth behind Benetech.

During their infiltration, they discovered that Ord, an alien from the Breakworld, was responsible for the means with which the company was able to develop the cure. While the team was separated, Kitty descended into a hidden complex beneath the Benetech building and was able to unlock the true secret behind the cure: shortly after Peter's self-sacrificing death, Ord had captured his body and left a duplicate that the X-Men had cremated.

After reviving him, Ord had used the Legacy Virus cure in Peter's bloodstream to develop his mutant cure. After unknowingly releasing Peter from his cell, Kitty rejoined him with the X-Men. Together they subdued Ord as he tried to escape Earth. Since reuniting with his friends, Peter has returned to fight with the X-Men, and he and Kitty were able to resume their romantic relationship.

Colossus: Bloodline
During the Colossus: Bloodline limited series, Colossus made a trip to Russia in response to a call for help from his cousin, journalist Larisa Mishchenko. Her research had established that their family descended from Grigori Rasputin, and that their relatives were being systematically murdered. Rasputin is established as having been a powerful mutant, whose power and life essence had been passed down to his descendants. As his descendants are murdered, his great power is invested in greater measure in the remaining descendants. When there is only one descendant left, Rasputin will be reborn within that individual. Mister Sinister, an old ally of Rasputin, is revealed as the man behind the murders.

Larisa is murdered by Sinister, but Colossus and his brother Mikhail foil Sinister's plot, and Mikhail banishes himself to a dimension where he can never die, but from which he can never return. If Sinister were to murder Colossus, Rasputin would be reborn in Mikhail, but locked in a dimension on his own. However, all those involved remained unaware of Colossus' son, Peter, in the Savage Land, whose presence could severely alter the situation. Colossus returned to the X-Men, a man without family. It is rumoured that the boy Michael Termani escaped the extermination and made his way to the United States of America in search of Colossus, whom he may be related to.

Breakworld and beyond
During an attack on the institute, Colossus engages Sebastian Shaw, although "Shaw" turned out to be an illusory attack by Cassandra Nova. It was revealed that Colossus is the mutant destined to destroy Breakworld according to the Breakworld's precogs. However, on a mission to the Breakworld, the X-Men discover that this was not an actual prophecy but an elaborate scheme created by Aghanne, the insane leader of a Breakworld reform cult, intended to bring about that world's destruction. Colossus is chosen for the prophecy as his unique organic steel form would allow him to destroy the planet's power source, initiating a chain reaction that would destroy the entire world. Realizing this, Colossus refuses to kill the planet although he does threaten to seize power and rule it if the Breakworld destroys the Earth as planned.

During the "World War Hulk" storyline, Colossus is one of the X-Men members that tries to defend Professor X against the Hulk, who has come looking for Charles as he is one of the members of the secret Illuminati that exiled him from Earth. During their battle, the Hulk reflects on Colossus' bravery, mentioning that Colossus might have made a "decent opponent" to the Hulk's previous incarnations. Locked in a test of strength, Hulk demonstrates his superior power by bending Colossus's arms backwards at the forearms, breaking them. Beast later uses a laser in the lab to heat his arms up near their melting point, while Strong Guy bends them back into place; his arms needed to be re-set in their metal form before he transformed back to his human form to avoid serious injury to them.

Colossus returns to Russia with Wolverine and Nightcrawler along for the ride. The trio are captured by the Russian government, who wish to find out why all their mutant agents succumbed to M-Day, and Colossus did not. This led to a battle against the Russians and Omega Red, who was being examined by their captors. After defeating Omega Red, the heroes receive a call from Cyclops informing them of their new home in San Francisco. They soon arrive back in the States, where they aid in rebuilding the X-Men.

Colossus was briefly a member of the Fifty State Initiative team called The Last Defenders alongside Nighthawk, She-Hulk, and Blazing Skull.

Joining the rest of the X-Men, Colossus relocates to San Francisco. Still mourning Kitty, the other X-Men try to cheer him up using various different methods from picking fights with him to throwing a party. In the end he tells them to leave him be, he just needs time. Later while walking through Golden Gate Park, he come across a little girl who needs help rescuing her Kitty from a tree to which he replies that nothing would make him happier.

X-Infernus

Colossus feels the X-Men are not doing enough to rescue Illyana from Limbo, and is upset. With the aid of Pixie, the team is able to enter Limbo, where they encounter hostile demons. After defeating the demons, the X-Men locate Illyana, who has been defeated by Witchfire. The X-Men and Magik defeat Witchfire by trapping her in the dimension that houses the Elder Gods. Illyana leaves Limbo with the X-Men when Cyclops and Colossus offer her a home.

Utopia
When the Dark Avengers head into San Francisco to battle any X-Men they can find, Colossus battles Venom. They later face off again when the combined Dark Avengers and Dark X-Men attack Utopia, with Colossus and the X-Men emerging victorious. 
It's also during this time that Colossus suffers from depression due to the loss of Kitty prior to the Messiah Complex. During this period, Magik arrives at Utopia to ask for help from the X-Men and her former teammates as there's a battle coming in Limbo. The reunion helps alleviate some of Colossus's depression, but after Magneto comes to Utopia, Magneto brings the bullet carrying Kitty back to Earth to save her in a show of good faith and Kitty and Colossus are reunited, but are initially unable to touch as Kitty spent so long phased to stop the bullet hitting something that she has 'forgotten' how to resume a tangible state on her own. Due to Warlord Krunn's mutant cure, Colossus was temporarily depowered and beaten in battle by him, but other Breakworld residents were able to restore Kitty to her fully tangible state.

Fear Itself

After the Juggernaut became Kuurth: Breaker of Stone, one of the Heralds of a long-dormant god of fear known as the Serpent, Colossus made a bargain with Cyttorak, the other-dimensional being who originally empowered the Juggernaut, to gain the power to stand against Kuurth. Colossus became the new avatar of the Juggernaut and was able to push Cain Marko back until Cain was summoned by The Serpent. This decision caused Kitty to break up with Colossus, as she cannot cope with his increasingly displayed willingness to sacrifice himself when she wants someone who will be willing to live for her.

Due to this, Colossus decides to stay on Utopia with Cyclops' team of X-Men instead of returning to Westchester due to his fear of his new Juggernaut powers being unsafe around children. After another stressful battle, Colossus realized that his powers were far more dangerous than he realized, and he requested to be locked up alongside his sister, only to be freed when needed on missions.

Avengers vs. X-Men
At the onset of the Avengers vs. X-Men storyline, Colossus is featured in fights against several characters, including Spider-Man, Red Hulk, and Thing. He is one of the few X-Men teleported by Magik to the dark side of the moon to confront the Avengers over Hope Summers. When the disruptor devised by Iron Man blasts and divides the Phoenix Force, part of it bonds to Colossus, who becomes one of the Phoenix Five along with Cyclops, Emma Frost, Magik and Namor. He attempts to release his Juggernaut powers, but Cyttorak refuses, citing his affiliation with the Phoenix due to his newfound destructive powers. While empowered with his fragment of the Phoenix Force, Colossus attempts to regain Kitty's affections, but she rejects him—wary of his power-mongering and that the Phoenix has changed him for the worse—he reacts angrily. Colossus is eventually defeated when Spider-Man manages to provoke him and Magik into attacking each other, causing them to incapacitate each other. Their Phoenix powers dissipate and are absorbed by Emma Frost and Cyclops (Namor having already been defeated). Following the defeat of Cyclops as the last of the Phoenix Five, Colossus and the other former members of the Phoenix Five did not surrender themselves to the authorities. Magik later purges the Juggernaut powers from Colossus with her Soulsword. Knowing that Magik could have repelled his servitude to Cyttorak at any time and that she made him keep the Juggernaut powers to teach him a lesson, Colossus evinces hatred toward the sister he once loved, going so far as to say he wants her killed.

X-Force
Colossus's powers have gone out of control, apparently as a result of losing the Phoenix Force, causing parts of him to shift between flesh and organic steel rather than all flesh or all organic steel. He now appears as a member of Cable's new X-Force team after Cable provides him with a device that stabilizes his condition.

Amazing X-Men
Colossus has since rejoined Wolverine's team of X-Men after his sister convinced him to, after quitting Cable's X-Force team following the results of the Cable and X-Force/Uncanny X-Force: Vendettas storyline. It is eventually discovered that Cyclops, Emma Frost, Magik, Magneto and Colossus were actually infected with nano-sentinels by Dark Beast, after the incident with the Phoenix Force, and that was the real cause for their flawed abilities. He has since regained control of his organic steel powers and has stopped wearing Cable's harness which helped him to stabilize his flesh and steel forms.

During this time, Cyttorak caused the Crimson Gem to reappear in the ancient temple and triggered a call for suitable candidates to become a new Juggernaut, which led to Colossus and Cain Marko joining a team of X-Men to stop the Gem from being claimed by forces such as Man-Killer and the former Living Monolith. However, when Adbol acquired the Gem for himself, Colossus invoked Cyttorak to confront him about the failure of all of his past Juggernauts, suggesting that Cyttorak withdraw his power from Adbol and empower a new avatar to a greater extent than any before. Unfortunately, Cyttorak chose to empower Marko rather than Colossus, with Marko resolving to destroy the X-Men present and then move on to kill Cyclops for the death of Professor X. With Marko now even immune to psychic attacks, he appeared truly unstoppable, but Colossus was able to defeat him by outmaneuvering the super-empowered Marko until he could strike the sea side cliff edge where they had been fighting, causing Cain to fall into the ocean below, taking him out of the fight at least for the moment.

During the Secret Wars storyline, Colossus is with the X-Men when they take part in the incursion event between Earth-616 and Earth-1610. The Hulk's Doc Green form uses Colossus in a Fastball Special that destroys the Triskelion.

Extraordinary X-Men
Colossus later joins Storm's new team of X-Men who are living in an isolated part of Limbo after magically transporting the mansion there, renaming it X-Haven. Their mission is to provide a refuge and protect mutants from the effects of the M-Pox that has infected the mutants and rendered almost all of the mutant species sterile due to the Terrigen in the atmosphere. During the Apocalypse Wars, Colossus, Ernst, Anole, Glob Herman and No-Girl are separated from Storm's team. When they re-encounter the missing students, they discover them to now be adults protecting an ark of 600 artificially created mutant embryos from the Four Horsemen of Apocalypse, one of whom is a celestially altered Colossus.

Colossus was eventually found by his teammates Iceman and Nightcrawler and teleported back to X-Haven by Cerebra. There, he was transformed back to normal by Apocalypse, who was tricked into doing so by Nightcrawler.

Inhumans vs X-Men and X-Men Gold
After Beast discovers that there isn't a cure for the M-Pox and no way to alter the Terrigen cloud the X-Men are left with the choice to either stay on earth and fight for their right to live and risk becoming extinct in a matter of weeks or leave earth and start fresh somewhere else. The X-Men decide to go to war against the Inhumans to decide the fate of the Terrigen. With the war underway Colossus is stationed at X-Haven to protect it from a potential Inhuman counter-attack. When the Inhuman Royal Family arrives to do just that, Colossus is left to face them on his own. He later joins the rest of the X-Men in Iceland in the final battle against the Inhumans, where Medusa finally understands what the X-Men are fighting for so she voluntarily destroys the Terrigen.

After the Terrigen is destroyed the X-Men sends the refugees back home from X-Haven now that earth is habitable for mutants again. Still, the X-Men find themselves wondering how to move forward with the events of the war still fresh in their minds. Storm asks Kitty Pryde to return to the X-Men and take her place as leader, and in doing so Kitty moves the mansion from Limbo to Central Park and creates a new field team and recruits Colossus. Colossus and Kitty share many awkward moments given their history, trying to move forward as friends but still feeling a chemistry.

Powers and abilities
Colossus is a mutant with the ability to transform his entire body into a form of "organic steel", with properties similar to osmium but of still unknown composition. Colossus must transform his entire body into this armored state; he cannot transform only a portion of his body. His weight is more than doubled. In his armored form, Colossus possesses superhuman levels of strength, as well as superhuman stamina and durability. His physical strength is currently greater than when he first joined the X-Men due to the realignment of his cells by Magneto following an injury during the Mutant Massacre. While in his armored form, Colossus requires no food, water or even oxygen to sustain himself and is extremely resistant to injury. He is capable of withstanding great impacts, large caliber bullets, falling from tremendous heights, electricity, and certain magical attacks. While he has great resistance to temperature extremes of hot and cold, extreme heat followed by rapid super-cooling has been shown to cause damage. As he is vulnerable to the anti-metal Antarctic Vibranium in his metal form, his body instinctively shifts to human form when faced with an Antarctic Vibranium weapon.

Colossus is an excellent hand-to-hand combatant, having been trained in Judo by Cyclops. He has had training in acrobatics and sword fighting from Nightcrawler. In his human form, he is still exceptionally strong and in superb physical condition, though not superhumanly so. He has completed college-level courses at Xavier's school.

As the unstoppable Avatar of Cyttorak, Colossus gained additional superhuman strength and resistance to injury, as well as other mystical powers. Among these was the power to ignore impediments to his movement, hence the "unstoppable" moniker. These powers were later taken away from Colossus and returned to Cain Marko.

Reception
 In 2014, Entertainment Weekly ranked Colossus 11th in their "Let's rank every X-Man ever" list.
 In 2018, CBR.com ranked Colossus 7th in their "Age Of Apocalypse: The 30 Strongest Characters In Marvel's Coolest Alternate World" list.
 In 2018, CBR.com ranked Colossus 13th in their "X-Force: 20 Powerful Members" list.

Other versions

Age of Apocalypse
In the Age of Apocalypse timeline, Piotr Rasputin/Colossus was a very haunted man, wearing a red mask to cover acid scars on his face. His sister, Illyana Rasputin, was thought to have died years prior, and his brother, Mikhail Rasputin, was captured by Apocalypse. Colossus became leader of the Super Soldiers and faced his brainwashed brother in combat. Now a Horseman of Apocalypse, Mikhail destroyed all of Russia's superheroes except his brother, and from that day the severely beaten Colossus chose to dedicate his life to stopping Apocalypse and Mikhail. He left Russia to find the X-Men. Colossus was one of Magneto's original recruits for his X-Men.

During his first mission as an X-Man, Colossus battled Sabretooth for the life of a young Jewish American mutant named Katherine Pryde/Shadowcat. Colossus fell in love with her, and the two would eventually marry. After years of fighting for Magneto's cause, Colossus lost the will to fight on a battlefield in Africa. He decided to retire from the X-Men. As a final favor to Magneto, he agreed to teach the next generation of mutants with his wife.

Colossus came out of retirement two times. The first time, he was injured so severely only Magneto's metal powers kept him alive. Colossus could not transform back to his human self without risking death. The second time, Magneto offered Colossus and Shadowcat an important mission. It was discovered that Illyana was indeed still alive and being held prisoner in a slave camp, and they needed to save her so they could restore the true timeline.

Colossus and Shadowcat sent their team into the Seattle Core to rescue Illyana. After they found her, Colossus demanded Shadowcat evacuate Illyana immediately, leaving their students behind. Shadowcat disagreed, but followed his orders after he told her that he would go back for their students. Colossus reached the front gate and peered back into the Core. Only one student, Husk, remained standing. Colossus allowed the gate to close without attempting to help. He returned to his wife and sister and claimed he had done all he could.

Colossus and Shadowcat delivered Illyana to Magneto, but after learning the reality Magneto was trying to save was a place where his sister was dead, Colossus went mad. He tried to follow his sister into the M'Kraan Crystal, injuring Iceman in the process, and when Shadowcat stepped in front of him, assuming he would calm down, he didn't. Colossus crushed his wife and killed her. Insane with grief, he was finally taken down by Gambit.

Mortally injured, he reverts to his human form and dies after his sister returns from the M'kraan Crystal.

Years later, when Weapon X had been transformed into Weapon Omega, the Heir of Apocalypse, Colossus was brought back to life through the combined efforts of Sugarman and Dark Beast, who had taken great pains to find and preserve his body. Along with many other "alphas", his mind was altered, turning him into a servant of Weapon Omega.

He was sent together with Azazel and Cyclops to confront another resurrected "alpha", Penance. Penance used her telepathic powers to restore Colossus' true memories, and he swore to help her in her quest to rebuild the world and lead mutants to a brighter future. A fight broke out between him and Cyclop, but Azazel teleported Cyclops and himself away.

Days of Future Past
In the Days of Future Past timeline (Earth-811), Colossus was detained in the South Bronx Mutant Containment Facility, like most of the surviving X-Men. In this reality he married Kate Pryde and they had children. When his wife transferred her consciousness into the Kitty Pride of Earth-616 and fell unconscious, Colossus tried to protect her from the Sentinels. As one of the last mutants on Earth, he infiltrated the Baxter Building on a suicide run in which he was killed by Sentinels trying to avenge the deaths of Storm and Wolverine.

Earth X
In Earth X, Colossus has become Tsar Piotr of Russia. His country's massive grain supply, protected by an army of Crimson Dynamos, provides one of the greatest food sources for the world. Occasionally, he is attacked by Life Model Decoys of Nick Fury, who seem to think that Piotr is a stereotypical Communist. It is mentioned in passing that at some point in the future, he will travel back in time and become Mister Sinister.

Exiles
Several versions of Colossus have been seen in the Exiles series.
 One was killed after betraying his Heroes for Hire teammates to save the alternative version of his sister, Magik.
 One dies protecting an alternative version of Shadowcat.

Marvel Zombies
A version of Colossus is seen in Dead Days when the zombifed Alpha Flight attack the mansion. Later, he is seen among the survivors and fighting the other zombie heroes. Colossus, Nightcrawler, Storm, Dr. Strange, Nick Fury and Thor fight a holding action to protect a teleporter from the zombie forces. The group realizes that their plan to evacuate survivors might lead to another innocent world being infected so they destroy the machine and willingly give themselves up to the zombies.

In Marvel Zombies: Halloween, Kitty Pryde and her son with Colossus, Peter Rasputin Pryde are two of the few surviving humans, years later.

Ultimate Marvel
In the Ultimate Marvel universe, Peter Rasputin reluctantly works as an arms smuggler for the Russian mob. Peter was saved from a firing squad as a young child by a boss in the Russian Mafia called Big Boris, who smuggles Peter from Siberia to the United States. Colossus' powers are similar to those of his Earth-616 counterpart. With the use of a deadly drug called Banshee, he has gained super strength to rival other powerhouses such as Thor. He is not immune to Rogue's touch as shown in the "Return to Weapon X" storyline.  He is also highly resistant to physical injury. He has withstood being slashed by Ultimate Wolverine's adamantium claws. He has also survived a localized nuclear explosion. A few deviations from the Earth-616 version include the fact that Ultimate Colossus's height remains the same when he changes. Unlike the mainstream version, his eyes remain vulnerable to pressure even in steel form, as shown when fighting Sam Wilson during Ultimate Nightmare.

Colossus is revealed as a mutant during an illegal arms transaction gone wrong. Everyone is killed by gunfire except for Peter, whose mutant ability saves him. Jean Grey finds him soon after and offers him a place among the X-Men.

When the X-Men embark on a world tour to promote Xavier's book, Colossus inexplicably disappears to Russia. Cyclops and Jean Grey track him and find Peter working in a factory. Colossus tells them he left due to unhappiness with his place on the team and with life as a mutant, but Jean suggests that his true reason is unrequited feelings he has for a fellow team member. Peter later comes to terms with his "gift," and becomes a Russian national hero when he rescues the crew of an incapacitated submarine. He leaves Russia to rejoin the X-Men.

Later, Colossus and the X-Men are forced out of the mansion with the U.S. Government on their tails. In a climactic battle between the X-Men and The Ultimates, Colossus is able to defeat Iron Man and Thor, but is finally temporarily incapacitated by Hawkeye who fires a compact nuclear warhead arrow (with a blast radius of about 20 feet) near him. With the surprise assistance from Iceman, the X-Men (without Professor Xavier) manage to regroup and escape.

The X-Men locate Magneto's flying citadel using a signal sent by a captured Cyclops. Upon their arrival, Magneto subdues them. Despite being composed of metal, Colossus' great strength and willpower allow him to overcome Magneto's control and beat Magneto mercilessly for the harm inflicted on Wolverine.

Unlike his mainstream counterpart, Ultimate Colossus is gay and does not have a romance with Ultimate Kitty Pryde/Shadowcat. This is implied during the Mark Millar's run on the title, through his interactions with fellow X-Man Wolverine (this is implied during the "Return of the King" story arc, in which Colossus almost beats Magneto to a pulp when he threatens Wolverine). It is implied (through stereotype) when Jean Grey reveals to the readers that Peter's favorite TV show is Will & Grace, but stated more directly in that the main reason Colossus left the X-Men might have been that he was unable to make the X-Man he'd fallen in love with love him, even in the slightest. Storm also suggests Peter is gay when Angel arrives at the school and Storm explains to him that the reason that all the girls "and maybe Colossus" stare at him is because he is good looking. It is more openly addressed later during a series of mutant murders by Sinister, Colossus tends to the wounds of Northstar, the only survivor. He is shocked when the openly gay Northstar asks if Colossus is single, which triggers a transformation into his metal state.

Colossus and Northstar amicably part ways and keep in touch even after Northstar's team, the Academy of Tomorrow, come to blows with the X-Men. Colossus later agrees to accompany Northstar to his homecoming dance. This disturbs Nightcrawler, Peter's friend, who begins to avoid and resent him. Their relationship becomes very strained after this and never really recovers, Nightcrawler believing that Colossus deliberately misled and "betrayed" him. This also marks a significant change in Nightcrawler's character: much of his relationship with Colossus in the mainstream versions of them also involves Kitty Pryde (Colossus' recurring love interest throughout most of the various X-Men chronicles)'s close relationship with Nightcrawler. In this version, there is no romantic relations between Pryde and Rasputin and all three characters are affected. In other versions, Nightcrawler is routinely seen as an outsider trying desperately to fit in, more so than the other X-Men, but in this one his blatant homophobia and disgust towards Colossus is a strong theme. Comments have been made with a double meaning toward Peter's sexuality, such as Bobby Drake saying "Too bad he's playing for the other team" during a baseball game against the Academy of Tomorrow.

Following Xavier's death, Northstar asks Colossus to come stay with him at the Academy of Tomorrow. Colossus finds a job as a construction worker and refuses to join Bishop's X-Men team.

It has been revealed that Colossus is dependent on the mutant enhancement drug Banshee for his super-human strength; without it, he cannot so much as lift his arms in his organic steel mode. It was also revealed that Peter came to work for the Russian mob after being banished from his home by his father, who had accidentally discovered him in bed with another man. Colossus briefly formed a Banshee-enhanced splinter group of X-Men, but they have since rejoined the main group drug-free.

After rejoining the main X-Men team, a tsunami hits New York and kills numerous people and superheroes including some of his teammates (Beast, Dazzler, and Nightcrawler). He fights against Magneto and his Brotherhood in their attack on the world. Colossus, alongside Jean Grey, Storm, Iceman, and Rogue, is one of the few X-Men to survive Magneto's rampage.

At the end of Ultimate X #5, Colossus is shown being held in a government facility: "Camp Angel" along with Storm and Spiral. It can be inferred from the narration of Karen Grant that the government is using them for testing on how to remove the mutant gene. At the start of Ultimate Comics: X-Men as a series, Colossus is seen in this camp. Despite the government's claims that mutants are being well-treated, Colossus is being maliciously tortured with electrical sticks. When the prison is overruled, and arguments started between Storm and Stacy X over the treatment of Warden Lake and Major Walker, until Colossus kills Lake, summoning a fleet of Nimrod Model Sentinels.

X-Men Forever 
In X-Men Forever, Colossus returns to Russia after the events of X-Men #1-3, where he becomes a government agent, handled by Natalia Romanova, the Black Widow, with whom he has struck up a romance. Although overjoyed to see his old teammates again, he is intent on staying and serving his country.

In other media

Television

 Colossus appears in Spider-Man and His Amazing Friends, voiced by John Stephenson. This version is a member of the X-Men.
 Colossus appears in Pryde of the X-Men, voiced by Dan Gilvezan.
 Colossus makes primarily non-speaking appearances in X-Men: The Animated Series, voiced by Rick Bennett in "The Unstoppable Juggernaut" and Robert Cait in "Red Dawn".
 Colossus appears in X-Men: Evolution, voiced by Michael Adamthwaite. This version joined Magneto's Acolytes after the latter threatened to hurt his family. Following Magneto's disappearance, Colossus returns to Russia, but later helps the X-Men fight Apocalypse. In a vision of the future that Professor X has, Colossus has officially joined the X-Men.
 Colossus appears in parts one and two of the Wolverine and the X-Men three-part episode "Hindsight", voiced by Phil Morris. This version was a member of the X-Men until they disbanded following Jean Grey's disappearance. A year later, when Professor Xavier tasks Wolverine with reuniting the X-Men, Colossus declines. Prior to the series' cancellation, Colossus was set to reappear in the second season alongside his sister Illyana.
 Colossus makes cameo appearances in The Super Hero Squad Show, voiced by Tom Kenny.
 Colossus makes a non-speaking cameo appearance in the Marvel Anime: X-Men episode "Destiny - Bond" as a member of the X-Men.
 Colossus appears in Marvel Disk Wars: The Avengers, voiced by Takahiro Fujimoto in Japanese and by Neil Kaplan in English. This version is a member of the X-Men.

Film

 Colossus makes a cameo appearance in X-Men (2000), portrayed by Donald Mackinnon. This version is a student of the Xavier Institute.
 Colossus appears in X2, portrayed by Daniel Cudmore.
 Colossus appears X-Men: The Last Stand, portrayed again by Daniel Cudmore. As of this film, he has joined the X-Men.
 Colossus appears in X-Men: Days of Future Past, portrayed again by Daniel Cudmore. As of a post-apocalyptic future where the Sentinels have driven mutants to the brink of extinction, Colossus assists his fellow X-Men in averting this time period until he is killed by a Sentinel. After Kitty Pryde helps Logan change the timeline, Colossus has become a teacher at the Xavier Institute alongside Pryde. Additionally, as part a viral marketing website promoting the film, it is revealed Colossus was one of several mutant babies born prematurely after the Chernobyl disaster.
 Colossus appears in Deadpool via CGI. Andre Tricoteux and T. J. Storm provided motion-capture stunts, Glenn Ennis provided the initial facial shapes, the film's motion capture supervisor Greg LaSalle provided the final facial performance, and Stefan Kapičić provides the voice. Deadpool director Tim Miller stated that Cudmore was originally offered the role, but he declined to return when he was informed that his voice would be dubbed over by Kapičić.
 Colossus appears in Deadpool 2, voiced again by Kapičić, who also provides facial performance capture, and physically portrayed again by Andre Tricoteux.

Video games
 Colossus appears in The Uncanny X-Men.
 Colossus appears as a playable character in X-Men: Madness in Murderworld.
 Colossus appears in X-Men II: The Fall of the Mutants.
 Colossus appears as a playable character in X-Men (1992).
 Colossus appears as a playable character in X-Men: Children of the Atom.
 Colossus appears as an assist character in Marvel vs. Capcom: Clash of Super Heroes.
 Colossus appears as a playable character in Marvel vs. Capcom 2: New Age of Heroes.
 Colossus appear as a non-player character (NPC) in X-Men: Reign of Apocalypse.
 Colossus appears as an NPC in X2: Wolverine's Revenge, voiced by Christopher Corey Smith. This version works at a prison called the Void.
 Colossus appears as a playable character in X-Men Legends, voiced by Earl Boen.
 Colossus appears in X-Men Legends II: Rise of Apocalypse, voiced by Jim Ward.
 Colossus appears as a playable character in the Game Boy Advance version of X-Men: The Official Game, voiced by Brad Abrell.
 Colossus appears as a playable character in the Wii, Xbox 360, Xbox One, PS3, PlayStation 4, and remastered PC versions of Marvel: Ultimate Alliance, voiced by Crispin Freeman. Additionally, he appears as a playable character in the PS2, PSP, Xbox, and original PC version via a mod and the possessed "Dark Colossus" appears as a boss across all versions of the game. 
 Colossus appears in Marvel: Ultimate Alliance 2, voiced by Nolan North. He appears a boss in the Pro-Registration campaign and an NPC in the Anti-Registration campaign.
 Colossus appears in X-Men: Destiny, voiced by Andre Sogliuzzo.
 Colossus appears as a playable character in Marvel Super Hero Squad Online.
 Colossus appears as a playable character in Marvel: Avengers Alliance.
 Colossus appears as a playable character in Marvel Heroes, voiced by Chris Cox.
 Colossus appears as an unlockable playable character in Lego Marvel Super Heroes, voiced by John DiMaggio.
 Two incarnations of Colossus appear as playable characters in Marvel Contest of Champions.
 Colossus appears as playable character in Marvel Future Fight.
 Colossus appears a playable character in Marvel Ultimate Alliance 3: The Black Order, voiced again by Chris Cox.

Miscellaneous
 Colossus appears in the Astonishing X-Men motion comics, initially voiced by Dan Green and later by Trevor Devall.
 Colossus appears in the X-Men/Star Trek crossover novel Planet X.

Collected editions

See also
 List of Russian superheroes

References

Characters created by Dave Cockrum
Characters created by Len Wein
Comics characters introduced in 1975
Deadpool characters
Excalibur (comics)
Fictional artists
Fictional characters with superhuman durability or invulnerability
Fictional farmers
Fictional immigrants to the United States
Fictional Russian people
Fictional Soviet people
Male characters in film
Marvel Comics characters with superhuman strength
Marvel Comics film characters
Marvel Comics male superheroes
Marvel Comics mutants
Russian superheroes
X-Men members